Márcio Rogério de Andrade (July 30, 1971 – July 17, 2007) was a Brazilian football player and a FIFA accredited football agent. Márcio and his family died on July 17, 2007, during an air disaster involving an Airbus A320 where they are all onboard TAM Airlines Flight 3054.

Death 
Andrade was one of the 199 fatal victims of the TAM Airlines Flight 3054 crash at São Paulo, Brazil (the deadliest air disaster in Brazilian territory), along with his family (including his spouse Melissa Ura Andrade, his daughter Alanis Ura Andrade and his brother-in-law André Doná Ura).

They went to Porto Alegre, where they attended a party at a farmhouse owned by the football player Ronaldinho Gaúcho, while Andrade was making a deal about a contract with the player, along with Gaúcho's brother and agent, Assis Moreira, and they were returning home via an Airbus A320 that crashed during landing at Congonhas Airport.

References

J.LEAGUE OFFICIAL GUIDE 1992-1993, 1992 

1971 births
2007 deaths
Brazilian footballers
Brazilian expatriate footballers
Expatriate footballers in Japan
J1 League players
Nagoya Grampus players
Victims of aviation accidents or incidents in Brazil
Association football forwards
TAM Airlines Flight 3054 victims